Cambodia follows UTC+07:00, which is 7 hours ahead of UTC. The local mean time in Phnom Penh was originally UTC+7:19. Cambodia used this local mean time until 1920, when it changed to Indochina Time, UTC+07:00; ICT is used all year round as Cambodia does not observe daylight saving time. Cambodia shares the same time zone with Western Indonesia, Thailand, Vietnam, Christmas Island, and Laos.

History

See also
List of time zones
ASEAN Common Time
Six-hour clock
Buddhist Era

References

External links

Cambodia
Society of Cambodia
Time in Southeast Asia